Juan Camilo Castillo Andrade (born 3 October 2002) is a Colombian professional footballer who plays as a defender for Philadelphia Union II in the USL Championship.

Career

Millonarios
Born in Tumaco, Castillo began his football career with local clubs Zipaquirá San Pablo and Expreso Dorado before joining the youth ranks of storied Colombian side Millonarios.

New York Red Bulls II
On 13 April 2021, Castillo left Millonarios, where he had been playing with the team's under-20 side in the Copa Libertadores U-20, to sign with USL Championship side New York Red Bulls II. He made his debut for New York on 14 May 2021, starting in a 1–0 loss to the Miami FC. Castillo re-signed with New York on 27 January 2022.

New York Red Bulls (loan)
On 22 June, 2022, the New York Red Bulls announced that they had signed Castillo to a short term loan ahead of their 2022 U.S. Open Cup quarterfinal against New York City FC.

Philadelphia Union II
On January 24, 2023, Castillo was announced as a new signing for MLS Next Pro side Philadelphia Union II.

International
Castillo has represented Colombia at the under-17 and under-20 level.

References

External links 
 

2002 births
Living people
Association football defenders
Colombian footballers
Colombian expatriate footballers
Colombian expatriate sportspeople in the United States
Expatriate soccer players in the United States
Millonarios F.C. players
New York Red Bulls II players
USL Championship players
People from Tumaco
Sportspeople from Nariño Department
Philadelphia Union II players